In the 1857 Chicago mayoral election, Republican John Wentworth defeated Democrat Benjamin F. Carver by a ten-point margin.

The election was held on March 3.

Background
The Democratic Party were coming off of the success of their presidential ticket in November 1856 (both nationally, as well as in Illinois). At a celebratory bonfire held across from the Tremont House, Stephen A. Douglas delivered a speech predicting a Democratic victory in the coming municipal elections, declaring "Chicago will yet redeem herself, she will do so at the next election, and after that she will be right at every election."

Election
Both the Republican Party and Democratic Party held nominating conventions on February 28. Republicans nominated congressman John Wentworth for mayor (who had previously served several terms as a Democratic congressman). Former congressman (and future president) Abraham Lincoln delivered an impassioned speech at the Republican convention on behalf of its ticket. Democrats nominated Benjamin F. Carver, cashier of the Marine Bank and the Chicago Marine and Fire Insurance Company and a relative unknown when compared to political the heavyweight Wentworth. The results of the Democratic convention were not made public until March 2, one day before the election.

Wentworth's platform aroused some anti-Irish and anti-Catholic sentiments. Wentworth had well-established support for abolitionist policies.

Election day was chaotic, with many instances of violence arising across the city. Wentworth ultimately won by a wide margin and demonstrated a possible coattail effect, with his Republican ticket sweeping the city's other municipal elections as well.

Results

References

1857
Chicago
1857 Illinois elections
1850s in Chicago